Pierre Bertrand (December 24, 1875 – December 22, 1948) was a politician in Quebec, Canada, and a Member of the Legislative Assembly of Quebec (MLA).

Early life

He was born on December 24, 1875, in Quebec City's St. Roch neighborhood.

City Councillor

Bertrand served as a city councillor for Quebec City Council from 1914 to 1927, 1930 to 1932 and 1936 to 1948.

Federal Politics

Bertrand ran as a Conservative candidate in the district of Quebec West in the 1921 federal election and finished second against Liberal incumbent Georges Parent.

Member of the legislature

He ran as a Labour candidate in the district of Saint-Sauveur in the 1923 provincial election and won.  He lost the 1927 provincial election.  Bertrand was re-elected as a Conservative candidate in the 1931 and the 1935 elections.  He joined Maurice Duplessis's Union Nationale and was re-elected in the 1936 election.

Legislative Councillor

Bertrand was appointed to the Legislative Council of Quebec not long before the 1939 election.

Death

He died on December 22, 1948.

References

1875 births
1948 deaths
Labour Party (Quebec) MNAs
Quebec City councillors
Union Nationale (Quebec) MLCs
Conservative Party of Quebec MNAs
Union Nationale (Quebec) MNAs